In graph theory, the resistance distance between two vertices of a simple, connected graph, is equal to the resistance between two equivalent points on an electrical network, constructed so as to correspond to , with each edge being replaced by a resistance of one ohm. It is a metric on graphs.

Definition

where 

Properties of resistance distance

If  then . For an undirected graph

General sum rule
For any -vertex simple connected graph  and arbitrary  matrix :

Two of note are;

This unordered sum 

is called the Kirchhoff index of the graph.

Relationship to the number of spanning trees of a graph

where  is the set of spanning trees for the graph .

As a squared Euclidean distance
Since the Laplacian  is symmetric and positive semi-definite, so is 
 
thus its pseudo-inverse  is also symmetric and positive semi-definite.  Thus, there is a  such that  and we can write:

Connection with Fibonacci numbers 

The resistance distance between vertex  and vertex  is 
 

See also 
 Conductance (graph)

References

 
 
 
 
 
 
 
 
 
 
 

 

 

Electrical resistance and conductance
Graph distance